AJSS Saintes de Terre-de-Haut is a football club in Guadeloupe, based in Terre-de-Haut

They play in Guadeloupe's first division, the Guadeloupe Championnat National.

Football clubs in Guadeloupe